Landers Shoot is a rural locality in the Sunshine Coast Region, Queensland, Australia.

Geography
Landers Shoot is in the Sunshine Coast hinterland.

History
Edmund Lander leased the area known as the Mooloolah Back Plain from the Queensland Government in 1861. He, along with other pioneers, harvested the timber along the Blackall Range. When the timber was harvested, the bark was stripped, making them slippery from the sap and a sharp point was made on one end of the tree. The tree was then pushed over the eastern side of the cliff down "chutes" (to be collected at the bottom, and transported to the nearest mills). Landers Shoot (a corruption of Lander's Chute) was the base region where the logs arrived at the base of the cliff.

Lander's Shoot State School opened on 17 February 1914 and closed on 31 December 1944. It was at approx 471 Upper Landershute Road.

Education 
There are no schools in Landers Shoot. The nearest government primary schools are Eudlo State School in neighbouring Eudlo to the south-east and Montville State School in neighbouring Montville to the north-west. The nearest government secondary school is Nambour State College in Nambour to the north.

Facilities 
Despite the name, Landers Shute Advanced Water Treatment Plant is a sewage treatment plant in neighbouring Montville, but is adjacent to the locality boundary with the Landers Shute.

References

Suburbs of the Sunshine Coast Region
1861 establishments in Australia
Localities in Queensland